Thomas Birkett (February 1, 1844 – December 2, 1920) was mayor of Ottawa, Ontario, Canada in 1891 and a member of the House of Commons of Canada representing Ottawa City from 1900 to 1904.

Birkett was born in Bytown (as Ottawa was known then) in 1844, the son of Miles Birkett and Elizabeth Wren, who came to Upper Canada from England. At the age of 13, he became an apprentice to a local hardware store owner. In 1866, he opened his own hardware store. Birkett served on the school board from 1867 to 1871 and was an alderman on Ottawa City Council from 1873 to 1878. During his term as mayor, electric streetcars were introduced in Ottawa. In 1871, he married Mary Gallagher; after her death, he married Henrietta Gallagher, her stepsister, in 1904. Birkett also served as president of the advisory board of the Dominion Building and Loan Association at Ottawa. He was also a long-time member of the Masonic Order. In 1900, he was named a trustee for the Ottawa Collegiate Institute. He died in Ottawa of pneumonia in 1920. He is buried at Beechwood Cemetery.

His former home, nicknamed Birkett's Castle, is now used as the Hungarian Embassy.

References 

Mayors of Ottawa
Members of the House of Commons of Canada from Ontario
Conservative Party of Canada (1867–1942) MPs
Canadian Methodists
1844 births
1920 deaths
Lisgar Collegiate Institute alumni